Sheung Yeung is a village in Sai Kung District, New Territories, Hong Kong.

Administration
Sheung Yeung is a recognized village under the New Territories Small House Policy.

History
At the time of the 1911 census, the population of Sheung Yeung was 85. The number of males was 34.

See also
 Hong Kong Adventist College
 Sheung Sze Wan

References

External links

 Delineation of area of existing village Sheung Yeung (Hang Hau) for election of resident representative (2019 to 2022)
 Antiquities Advisory Board. Historic Building Appraisal. Lau Ancestral Hall, Sheung Yeung Pictures

 

Villages in Sai Kung District, Hong Kong
Clear Water Bay Peninsula